Wuchuan is a county-level city in the southwest of Guangdong province, China. It is the easternmost county-level division of the prefecture-level city of Zhanjiang.

History
Under the Sui, Wuchuan was a small county called Wujiang from the nearby Jian River. Under the Qing, Wuchuan was administered from Gaozhou Commandery (now a county-level city within neighboring Maoming Prefecture). On May 26, 1994, the Ministry of Civil Affairs of the People's Republic of China agreed to Wuchuan County's elevation to county-level city status and placed it under the administration of Zhanjiang.

Geography
Wuchuan sits on the Jian River where it empties into the South China Sea, at the eastern coast of the Leizhou Peninsula. It borders Zhanjiang's Potou District to the west, Lianjiang to the west, Huazhou to the north, and the Maoming districts of Maonan and Dianbai to the east and northeast.

Climate

Culture

Language
Three main language varieties are spoken in Wuchuan.
Baihua 白话: a Yue Chinese dialect
Donghua 东话 (Leihua 雷话): a Southern Min Chinese dialect spoken in Lanshi 兰石, Tanba 覃巴, Wangcungang 王村港
Haihua 海话 (Jizhao 吉兆话): spoken on the coast

The spoken language in Zhanjiang's northern downtown districts is largely Cantonese while Leizhou Min language is the prestige language in Mazhang District, Leizhou City and other nearby counties also speak the Leizhou Min as well. The dialect in Lianjiang County is Hakka. The time zone for Zhanjiang, as with all locations in the People's Republic of China, is Beijing time (GMT +8).

Jianjiang drainage basin is a region where people of Han nationality and the other Baiyue ethnic groups had lived together in history. Local authorities which are subordinated to the central government of Han nationality habe been established since the Northern and Southern Dynasties. The establishment of the local government of Luozhou and Gaozhou and their close relationships with Guangzhou have promoted the Hanization of the local Baiyue ethnic groups, which in turn made the formation of the Wuchuan-Huazhou Cantonese, a dialectal Chinese, come into being.

Folk Custom
Piaose

Piaose was a kind of important folk art in Guangdong province. As time went by, it has disappeared in many places. But in Wuchuan, it still connect with local persons' life and local culture. Wuchuan Piaose has great aesthetic value, artistic value and humanistic value. It integrates idiographic pictures basing on its source and constitution. At the same time, Wuchan Piaose is also facing the attack of foreign culture, inderitente, funding, publicity and artistic innovation.
In 2009 July, Wuchuan Piaose team was invited to take part in the "Chengdu International Intangible Cultural Heritage festival".
Clay Sculpture
Clay sculpture is an "Original Art", and its original characteristic determines that it is one of the most ancient human arts. Clay sculpture not only records folk life, but also creates the colourful art space. The regionality and stability of clay Sculpture art represent the people's value orientation and aesthetic experience. Protecting its "cultural difference" and aesthetic multiformity becomes an important strategy for the survival of China's contemporary clay sculpture art.
Years-cases
Years-cases are activities of local characteristics in the western Guangdong. This festival based on local god. Years-cases fill with many kinds of fastidious complex sacrifice ceremony. And all rituals are conducted as one. Years-cases are composed of four sections such as the gods of years-cases, rituals of years-cases, opera of years-cases and feast of years-cases. The gods of years-cases is the core of years-cases. The chapter mainly focuses on
the changes of years-cases gods' image. The images tend to complicate things. There are two major patterns to the changes of gods' images. For example, it is a combination of multiple gods' images. Moreover, there are several different gods in the same ritual of years-cases. The changes of gods show people's ideas and concepts. God's parade is the most important part of the years-cases' ritual. It reflects people's culture or faith. We will use the field survey of Beiyue village's ritual as an example. And then we focus on the patterns of years-cases' ritual in the changes. It is planning to go in for further studies in secularization and commercialization of years-cases. Opera of years-cases means mainly opera performance in the night The ritual and opera must fit together and complement each other. Opera is one of the ceremonies. At the same time actor is a priest. It focuses on years-cases' allegorizations. Feast of years-cases also is a ritual. Symbolically food is consumed by people. It is a ritual process. Local eating habits defend the eating culture. Needs of
symbolically food is to develop the pig industry and poultry industry in Wuchuan.

Historic spot
Maoshan Ancient Academy
It is located in the Wuchuan Bo Pu Zhen. 1700 years ago, it was a library created by Wang Jun.
Xiangshan Ancient Temple
It was built in 283 and has been rebuilt several times.

Famous Persons
Lin Shaotang (1786～1872), an ethnic Putianese Min person from Wu Yang Zhen, one of the champion of Imperial Examination. And he is one of the few overseas ethnic Putian Min champions.
Chen Lanbin (1816～1895) born in Huang Po Zhen, minister, scholar in the late Qing Dynasty, and the first China ambassador to the United States.
Li Hanhun (1894-1987) graduated from Baoding army officer school in 1919.  In 1926 he participated in the northern expedition. During the period of Anti Japanese War, he was an army colonel, served as commander of Army Group Commander, Guangdong provincial government chairman.
Liu Huaqiu (1939- )deputy director of the center for international economic exchanges.
Yu Yilong (1965- ) the famous Chinese hard pen calligraphy.

Education
Up to 2013, there are 468 schools on all levels in Wuchuan, including 1 teacher training school, 11 middle schools and 296 primary schools. There are 206,202 students studying at schools, including 97,778 high schools students, 77,179 primary school students and many nursery school students.
Wuchuan NO.1 Middle School
It was founded in 1927, November 11 and it was the most famous school in Wuchuan. Each year, about 3,000 students graduated from this middle school and most of them can enter in good universities.
Wuchuan NO.3 Middle School
It was founded in 1964 and it developed really fast. It is one of the best middle school in Wuchuan.

Notes

References

External links 
七律·读清代名臣陈兰彬生平事迹感怀四首(之四) (in Chinese).
Zhanjiang China – Cairns Regional Council.

County-level cities in Guangdong
Zhanjiang